Chilliwack Secondary is a public high school in Chilliwack, British Columbia part of School District 33 Chilliwack. The first Chilliwack Secondary was established in 1903. The school moved to its present site in 1950. It is finished construction converting it to a hybrid high school and community centre. The project was completed in 2013.

Alumni
 Tony Clarke, activist
 Allan Fotheringham, satirical journalist
 Patrick Gallagher, actor
 Lewis MacKenzie, retired Canadian major-general, author and media commentator.
 Jack McGaw, Broadcast Journalist
 George Pedersen, past president of five Canadian Universities
 Diana Swain, CBC Anchorperson
 Homer Thompson, Classical scholar
 Tasha Tilberg, supermodel

References

External links
 Chilliwack Senior-History

High schools in British Columbia
Education in Chilliwack
Educational institutions established in 1903
1903 establishments in British Columbia